The ABC Hornet was an 80 hp (90 kW) four-cylinder aero engine designed in the late 1920s by the noted British engineer Granville Bradshaw for use in light aircraft. The Hornet was effectively a double Scorpion and was built by ABC Motors, first running in 1929.

In 1931 the engine was re-designed, including the adoption of the new Hiduminium alloys for the crankcase, exhaust manifolds and pistons.

Applications
Airship Development AD1
Civilian Coupe
Robinson Redwing
Southern Martlet
Westland Widgeon

Specifications (Hornet)

See also

References

Notes

Bibliography

 Lumsden, Alec. British Piston Engines and their Aircraft. Marlborough, Wiltshire: Airlife Publishing, 2003. .

External links

1920s aircraft piston engines
Hornet
Airship engines